Vila is a locality located in the municipality of Vielha e Mijaran, in Province of Lleida province, Catalonia, Spain. As of 2020, it has a population of 57.

Geography 
Vila is located 168km north of Lleida.

References

Populated places in the Province of Lleida